Kaa is a fictional character from The Jungle Book stories written by Rudyard Kipling. He is a giant snake who is 30 feet long.

In the books and many of the screen adaptations, Kaa is an ally of main protagonist Mowgli, acting as a friend and trusted mentor or father figure alongside Bagheera and Baloo. However, Disney's screen adaptations portray him as a secondary antagonist who attempts to eat Mowgli.

Kipling's Mowgli Stories
First introduced in the story "Kaa's Hunting" in The Jungle Book, Kaa is a huge and powerful snake, more than 100 years old and still in his prime. In "Kaa's Hunting", Bagheera and Baloo enlist Kaa's help to rescue Mowgli when the man-cub is kidnapped by Bandar-log (monkeys) and taken to an abandoned human city called the Cold Lairs. Kaa breaks down the wall of the building in which Mowgli is imprisoned and uses his serpentine hypnosis to draw the monkeys toward his waiting jaws. Bagheera and Baloo are also hypnotized, but Mowgli is immune because he is human and breaks the spell on his friends.

In The Second Jungle Book, Kaa appears in the first half of the story "The King's Ankus". After Kaa and Mowgli spend some time relaxing, bathing and wrestling, Kaa persuades Mowgli to visit a treasure chamber guarded by an old cobra beneath the same Cold Lairs. The cobra tries to kill Mowgli but its venom has dried up. Mowgli takes a jeweled item away as a souvenir, not realizing the trouble it will cause them, and Kaa departs.

In "Red Dog", Mowgli asks Kaa for help when his wolf pack is threatened by rampaging dholes (the red dogs of the title). Kaa goes into a trance so that he can search his century-long memory for a stratagem to defeat the dogs:

With Kaa's help Mowgli tricks the dholes into attacking prematurely. Kaa takes no part in the resulting battle (obliquely citing his loyalty to the boy rather than to the wolves, who often caused Mowgli grief) but Mowgli and the wolves finally kill all the dholes, though not without grievous losses.

In "The Spring Running", as the teenage Mowgli reluctantly prepares to leave the jungle for the last time, Kaa tells Mowgli that "it is hard to cast the skin," but Mowgli knows he must cast the skin of his old life in order to grow a new one. Kaa, Baloo and Bagheera sing for Mowgli in "The Outsong", a poem and the ending of "The Spring Running".

Disney adaptations

1967 animated film and sequels

Kaa appears in the 1967 animated adaptation by Walt Disney Productions. This version of Kaa is recast as an antagonist, as Walt Disney felt audiences would not sympathize with a snake character. The voice of Kaa is provided by Sterling Holloway.

Kaa notices Mowgli in a tree one night and, rather than a serpentine dance, uses his hypnotic eyes to lull Mowgli into a deep sleep. Kaa nearly eats Mowgli before Bagheera awakens nearby, notices him, and slaps him, awakening Mowgli. Kaa retaliates by hypnotizing Bagheera, though Mowgli pushes Kaa out of the tree, making him unravel violently. Kaa encounters Mowgli again later in the film and once again, hypnotizes him, this time using his song, "Trust in Me", to lull him into a deep trance, though he must hide him when Shere Khan asks him if he's seen the boy. Shere Khan makes Kaa swear to tell him when he finds Mowgli and leaves, though Mowgli eventually wakes up and pushes Kaa out of the tree again.

Kaa is based on earlier characters from Disney films who comically and unsuccessfully attempt to eat the protagonist, including Tick-Tock the crocodile from Peter Pan and the wolf from The Sword in the Stone. Holloway provided Kaa with a hissing lisp while voicing him, which the Sherman Brothers incorporated into Kaa's song "Trust in Me".

Kaa returns in The Jungle Book 2, now voiced by Jim Cummings and has a smaller role. Kaa again tries and fails to eat Mowgli while he and Baloo are singing "The Bare Necessities". He angrily swears that he will "never again associate with mancubs" until he discovers Mowgli's human friend Shanti. He hypnotizes her, and tries to eat her. Mowgli's adoptive brother Ranjan thwarts him, causing him to fall down a cliff. Shere Khan finds Kaa again and asks him where Mowgli is, but Kaa lies that Mowgli is heading toward the swamp.

Kaa appears in the prequel series Jungle Cubs, where he is voiced by Jim Cummings. Kaa is seen as a snakeling who is still trying to master his hypnotic abilities, though he is cowardly. He is shown as a protagonist as opposed to the 1967 film, being friendly with the other cubs.

1994 live-action film
Kaa appears in the 1994 live-action adaptation as a large Burmese Python, though most of his appearances are created using both animatronics and computer-generated imagery, though they did use an unnamed trained anaconda.

Kaa is depicted as a far more menacing predator who lives in Monkey City with King Louie, guarding the orangutan's treasure from intruders. Kaa attacks Mowgli and tries to drown him in a moat, but Mowgli wounds him with a dagger, forcing him to flee in a cloud of blood. Louie summons Kaa again after Mowgli defeats Captain Boone and Boone begins stealing treasure; Kaa scares Boone into the moat, where the stolen treasure weighs him down to the bottom. Struggling to free himself, Boone sees the skeletal remains of Kaa's past victims moments before he meets his death by the python.

2016 live-action/CGI hybrid film
Kaa appears in the 2016 remake of the 1967 film as an indian python. This version of Kaa is female and voiced by Scarlett Johansson.

As in the 1967 film, Kaa is a villain desiring to hypnotize and eat Mowgli but like the 2003 sequel Kaa has a minor role. While Mowgli is hypnotized, Kaa reveals that he came to live in the jungle after Shere Khan killed his father and Bagheera found him, then describes to him the power of the dangerous "red flower", fire. Kaa tries to devour Mowgli, but Baloo discovers her and rescues Mowgli.

Johansson described Kaa in an interview as a "window into Mowgli's past" who uses storytelling to seduce and entrap Mowgli, noting that the way Kaa moves is "very alluring" and "almost coquettish". Johansson also recorded a new version of "Trust in Me" for the film, saying the song was "a strange melody. We wanted it to be a lullaby, but it has a very mysterious sound."

Other appearances
 In the 1967 Adventures of Mowgli Soviet cartoons, Kaa was voiced by Vladimir Ushakov in the Russian version, by Sam Elliott in the English dub, and by Adriano Celentano in the Italian dub. This version of the serpent, like the cartoons in general, is faithful to the original books.
 In the 1989 Japanese anime series Jungle Book Shōnen Mowgli, Kaa's personality is closer to the books than the Disney series. He is voiced by Keaton Yamada in the Japanese and Terrence Scammell in the English dub.
 A snake-like character resembling Kaa made a cameo during the final scene of Who Framed Roger Rabbit (1988) with the other Disney characters.
 Kaa also made an appearance in the 1997 live-action film The Second Jungle Book: Mowgli & Baloo. He appears as the snake charmer Karait's pet female python.
 In the 2010 CGI animated television series, Kaa is given a more ferocious personality than in the books, but at the same time he is friends and allies with Mowgli, Bagheera, and Baloo.
 In Mowgli: Legend of the Jungle, Kaa is a gigantic female Indian python with a calm but intimidating personality. She is a seer and is bigger than her 2016 counterpart with darker green and lighter yellow scales. She has more human facial features and full puffy lips. She is voiced by Cate Blanchett. This version is closer to the Kipling books, being a seer who takes a mentor-like role toward Mowgli and even saving his life at one point in the film.
 In the 2022 short The Simpsons: Welcome to the Club Kaa is one of the Disney villains meeting Lisa Simpson. This was the very first time the character appears in animation ever since The Jungle Book 2 and just like the 2016 live action Disney film he is a female character who was voiced by Dawnn Lewis. In the end credits he was shown hypnotizing Homer Simpson in his coils.

See also

References

External links

Fictional hypnotists and indoctrinators
Fictional snakes
The Jungle Book characters
Male film villains
Literary characters introduced in 1894
Male characters in literature